04 is the fourth album by English indie rock band Six by Seven. It was released in 2004, and the first on their own Saturday Night Sunday Morning Records label after being released from Beggars Banquet Records. It was also their first after bass player Paul Douglas left the band and found them trying to capture their sound – which had been recorded live in the studio on The Way I Feel Today – as a three-piece.

Track listing

Personnel 
Chris Olley – vocals, guitars, bass, harmonica
Chris Davis – drums
James Flower – Hammond organ, keyboards

Production
Dave Fridmann – mixing
Ric Peet – engineer

References 

Six by Seven albums
2004 albums